Two Dollar Radio Headquarters (HQ) is an independent bookstore, performance and event space, bar, coffeehouse, and a counter-service vegan café located in the South Side neighborhood of Ganthers Place within Thurman Square in Columbus, Ohio. It is locally owned and operated by Eric Obenauf — publisher of the indie press also based in Columbus, Ohio, Two Dollar Radio — and Brett Gregory, with Eliza Wood-Obenauf, and opened in September 2017. As a bookstore, they carry a curated selection of independently published literature, as well as their own Two Dollar Radio books.

The café has a regular menu that uses home-made vegan meats, cheeses, and sauces in dips, sandwiches, wraps, pizzas, salads, tacos, desserts, and has a separate weekend brunch menu. They serve tea and coffee drinks using locally roasted and certified organic One Line Coffee, with plant-based milks such as oat, soy, almond, and coconut. Their full bar serves cocktails, wine, and beer, with a rotating selection of draft beer, including local Hoof Hearted Brewing.

The venue hosts live cultural events such as author readings, reading series, film screenings, comedy nights, slam poetry open mics, and music from DJs, touring and local bands, and chamber music from local group Chamber Brews.

See also
 List of vegetarian restaurants
 List of independent bookstores in the United States

References

External links

Culture of Columbus, Ohio
Food and drink companies based in Ohio
Independent bookstores of the United States
Music venues in Columbus, Ohio
Restaurants in Ohio
Tourist attractions in Columbus, Ohio
Veganism
Vegan restaurants in the United States
2017 establishments in Ohio